The  of the Japan Academy Film Prize is one of the annual Awards given by the Japan Academy Film Prize Association.

List of winners

External links
 Japan Academy Film Prize official website - 

Director of the Year
Awards for best director
Japanese awards